Entypoma is a genus of parasitoid wasps belonging to the family Ichneumonidae.

The species of this genus are found in Europe and Northern America.

Species:
 Entypoma ferale Rossem, 1988 
 Entypoma frontosum Rossem, 1988

References

Ichneumonidae
Ichneumonidae genera